Garessio railway station is the train station serving the comune of Garessio, in the Piedmont region, northwestern Italy. It is the junction of the Ceva–Ormea.

The station is currently managed by Rete Ferroviaria Italiana (RFI). However, the passenger building is managed by comune. The station is served only by historic trains, in the service of tourism, on planned dates. The regular service has been suspended from 12 June 2012, by decision of the Piedmont Region. Train services are operated by Fondazione FS and Trenitalia. Each of these companies is a subsidiary of Ferrovie dello Stato (FS), Italy's state-owned rail company.

History
The station was opened on 15 July 1890, upon the inauguration of the track from Priola to Garessio of the Ceva–Ormea railway.

Features
Two tracks equipped with platform.

Train services
The station is served by the following services:

Historic train (Treno storico) Turin - Ceva - Ormea

See also

 History of rail transport in Italy
 List of railway stations in Piedmont
 Rail transport in Italy
 Railway stations in Italy

References

External links

Railway stations in Piedmont
Railway stations opened in 1890